Gaw Yin Gyi Island is an island in Ayeyarwady Region in South West Myanmar. It is located near Nanthapu village, Ngayokekaung sub-township, Pathein District of Myanmar. It is a tourist destination due to its beautiful rock formation and reefs.

History

Geography
There are some rocky islets which also have beautiful and unspoiled beaches .

Rock Climbing
There is a rock climbing and bouldering site. Deep water soloing is available.

Transportation
While buses and cars operate, it is also reached by boat.

Gallery

References 

Islands of Myanmar
Ayeyarwady Region